Stephenson Island, also called Mahinepua Island, is the larger of a pair of small islands  off the northern coast of New Zealand in Whangaroa Bay. Immediately to the northwest lies the smaller Cone Island. Satellite imagery indicates that the islands are partially forested and contain only two sites with buildings as discernible signs of habitation.

Land Information New Zealand records show that the islands are jointly owned by eleven families and are classified as Maori Land.

The Māori name for Stephenson Island is Mahinepua Island, which is rarely seen on maps; both are official names for the island. The highest point is Ririwha, at  elevation.

See also

 List of islands of New Zealand
 List of islands
 Desert island

References

Uninhabited islands of New Zealand
Islands of the Northland Region